Steve Rodriguez (born 1971) is a goofy-footed American skateboarder, skate company owner, skatepark designer, community organizer, and creative services director, who lives and skates in NYC. Rodriguez is a leader in the effort to restore the iconic New York City skate spot: the Brooklyn Banks, a place where Rodriguez spent much time skateboarding. Until it closed for construction in 2010, Rodriguez hosted skate contests at the Banks.

Skateboarding

Early life 
Raised in Sayreville, New Jersey, Rodriguez discovered skateboarding around 1983 and started skating not long after. He started skating in New York City as a teen, working for his mom who managed a store in the City. Rodriguez would skate through the city while doing deliveries and running other errands.

Skateboarding career 
In 1996, Rodriguez and a group of NYC skaters founded 5Boro skateboards. The original 5Boro squad being: Andy Henry, Neil Morgan, Pat Guidotti, Jim Young, JP Lotz, Alex Corporan, Dan Pensyl, Tato Feliciano, Ben Wall, and Jay Hammond. In 2004, 5Boro collaborated with the Beastie Boys to produce an exclusive co-branded board graphic.

Skate video appearances 
 1999: Fire It Up - 5boro
 2004: Word of Mouth - 5boro
 2007: Short Ends - Champman Skateboards
 2012: Join, Or Die - 5boro

Skateparks designed or co-designed
 LES Skatepark
Golconda Skatepark (Fat Kid)
Sgt. William Dougherty Skate Park
River Avenue Skate Park

References 

1971 births
American skateboarders
Living people